This is a list of scientific, technical and general interest periodicals published by Elsevier or one of its imprints or subsidiary companies. Both printed items and electronic publications are included in this list.

A

B

C

D

E

F

G

H
 Heart Rhythm
 Historia Mathematica
 Human Immunology

I

J

L

M

N

O

P

R

S

T

U
 Ultramicroscopy
 Urology

V

 Veterinary Microbiology

W

Z
 Zeitschrift für Evidenz, Fortbildung und Qualität im Gesundheitswesen

See also

References

Periodicals
Elsevier